Eicher School is a school in the Faridabad district in the state of Haryana, India, with 2,000 students and 120 teachers. It has classrooms and laboratories, features a computer aided teaching system. The principal is Arpita Chakraborty.

The school is strong in swimming and basketball and has had swimmers winning national-level awards and a basketball team that has been district champions many times. A team from the school won a quiz competition held at Alwar and stood at 18th place out of 295 in the Delhi NIE quiz.

Eicher has won International School Award (2015–18), awarded by the British Council.

Its main competitors are Modern Vidya Niketan and Delhi Public School. The school's two other branches are in Parwanoo and Alwar.

References

External links
Eicher School

Schools in Faridabad